CQ News is a weekly newspaper published on Fridays in Central Queensland, Australia. Its circulation through the Central Highlands Region is approximately 5800 copies.

History 
In 1937 the Gibson family began publishing the Central Queensland News in Emerald.  It merged with the Clermont Telegraph in 1980. In 1985 the Provincial Newspaper (Qld) Ltd purchase the newspaper from the Gibsons. As at 2019, it is owned by News Corp Australia.

References 

Newspapers published in Queensland
Central Highlands Region
Weekly newspapers published in Australia